Adenylate kinase 1 is a protein that in humans is encoded by the AK1 gene.

Function

This gene encodes an adenylate kinase enzyme involved in energy metabolism and homeostasis of cellular adenine nucleotide ratios in different intracellular compartments. This gene is highly expressed in skeletal muscle, brain and erythrocytes. Certain mutations in this gene resulting in a functionally inadequate enzyme are associated with a rare genetic disorder causing nonspherocytic hemolytic anemia. Alternative splicing of this gene results in multiple transcript variants encoding different isoforms. [provided by RefSeq, Dec 2015].

References

Further reading